Arthur Henn may refer to:

 Arthur E. Henn (1940–2001), admiral in the United States Coast Guard
 Arthur Wilbur Henn (1890–1959), American ichthyologist and herpetologist